The Leader of the Opposition (Urdu: قائد حزب اختلاف), is the people's elected politician who is, by law, the leader of the Official Opposition in Pakistan. The Leader of the Opposition is the leader of the largest political party in the National Assembly that is not in government. This is usually the leader of the second-largest political party in the National Assembly.

The leader of the opposition is normally viewed as an alternative Prime Minister. There is also a Leader of the Opposition in the Senate, who is elected / nominated separately by the opposition members of the Senate of Pakistan.

List
A list of the leaders of the Opposition before and according to the 1973 Constitution of Pakistan;

See also 
 National Assembly of Pakistan
 Government of Pakistan
 Politics of Pakistan
 Pakistan

References 

Politics of Pakistan
Leaders of the Opposition (Pakistan)
Pakistan